was a theme park in Yahatahigashi-ku, Japan. It had six roller coasters: Black Hole Scramble, Venus GP, Zaturn, Boogie-woogie Space Coaster, Titan Max, and Clipper.

In 2016, the park officially announced that it would close at the end of the following year.  The park permanently closed at 2 am, 1 January 2018.

Ferris wheel

Ice Aquarium
In October 2016, the park opened its new Ice Aquarium ice rink. Embedded in the ice were approximately 5,000 dead fish, which caused public outrage. The park closed the attraction on 27 November.

References

External links

1990 establishments in Japan
Buildings and structures in Kitakyushu
2018 disestablishments in Japan
Defunct amusement parks in Japan
Tourist attractions in Kitakyushu
Amusement parks opened in 1990
Outer space in amusement parks